William Henry Shorthouse (27 May 1922 – 6 September 2008) was an English professional football player and coach, who spent his playing career with Wolverhampton Wanderers.

Career
Born in Bilston, Staffordshire, Shorthouse attended St Martin's School in nearby Bradley. He served in the Royal Engineers in the Second World War, and was wounded in the arm during the Normandy landings. He had joined Wolverhampton Wanderers as an amateur in 1941; his senior debut came on 23 August 1947 in a 4–3 First Division defeat at Manchester City.

He played as a defender, first at centre-half until replaced by Billy Wright, then at full-back. He was part of the club's 1949 FA Cup-winning team and was a near ever-present as the club won their first league championship in the 1953–54 season.

The defender remained a first choice player at Molineux until retiring in late 1956. In total, he played 376 senior games for the club – putting him among the club's top 20 appearance makers – before launching a career in coaching.

Shorthouse went on to coach at Birmingham City, and he and chief scout Don Dorman acted as caretaker managers at the end of the 1969–70 season while the club sought a replacement after Stan Cullis, Shorthouse's former manager at Wolves, retired. He also briefly coached the England youth team during the following season and later worked as a youth team coach at Aston Villa, guiding them to victory in the 1980 FA Youth Cup.

Known as "The Baron" to his teammates, he died in a Wolverhampton nursing home on 6 September 2008 at the age of 86. He had been suffering from dementia.

Honours
Wolverhampton Wanderers
 First Division
 champions: 1953–54
 runners-up: 1949–50, 1954–55
 FA Cup winners: 1949
 FA Charity Shield shared: 1949

References

External links

1922 births
2008 deaths
People from Bilston
English footballers
Association football defenders
Wolverhampton Wanderers F.C. players
English Football League players
English football managers
Birmingham City F.C. managers
British Army personnel of World War II
FA Cup Final players
Royal Engineers soldiers